The March 742 is an open-wheel race car, designed, developed and built by British manufacturer March Engineering, and constructed to Formula Two regulations, and introduced for the 1974 championship. It's Formula Atlantic equivalent, used in the Atlantic Championship, known as the March 74B, was based on the 742.

References

Formula Two cars
March vehicles
Open wheel racing cars